This name may indicate either of the following:
 Elizabeth Cotton, Lady Hope
 May Yohé, the wife of Lord Francis Hope